The West Fork is one of two major streams, the other being the East Fork, that combine to form the San Gabriel River in Los Angeles County, California.

The major tributaries of the West Fork, from upstream to downstream, are Devil Creek, Bear Creek and the North Fork San Gabriel River. A large portion of the watershed is situated in the San Gabriel Wilderness, whose southern boundary is formed by the West Fork. Cogswell Dam impounds the river to create the  Cogswell Reservoir, whose primary function is flood and silt control for the San Gabriel Valley.The West Fork of the San Gabriel River is a refuge for Southern California wild rainbow trout.

See also
List of rivers of California

References

Rivers of Los Angeles County, California